Larymna was a town of ancient Caria. 
 
Its site is located near Incirli Ada, Asiatic Turkey.

References

Populated places in ancient Caria
Former populated places in Turkey